The 1774 British general election returned members to serve in the House of Commons of the 14th Parliament of Great Britain to be held, after the merger of the Parliament of England and the Parliament of Scotland in 1707. Lord North's government was returned with a large majority. The opposition consisted of factions supporting the Marquess of Rockingham and the Earl of Chatham, both of whom referred to themselves as Whigs. North's opponents referred to his supporters as Tories, but no Tory party existed at the time and his supporters rejected the label.

Summary of the constituencies
See 1796 British general election for details. The constituencies used were the same throughout the existence of the Parliament of Great Britain.

Dates of election
The general election was held between 5 October 1774 and 10 November 1774. North's ministry pushed for elections to occur in 1774 (instead of the originally planned 1775) in part due to wanting to avoid having an election coincide with increasing tensions in the American colonies.

At this period elections did not take place at the same time in every constituency. The returning officer in each county or parliamentary borough fixed the precise date (see husting for details of the conduct of the elections).

Results

Seats summary

See also
List of parliaments of Great Britain
List of MPs elected in the 1774 British general election

References

 British Electoral Facts 1832–1999, compiled and edited by Colin Rallings and Michael Thrasher (Ashgate Publishing Ltd 2000). (For dates of elections before 1832, see the footnote to Table 5.02).
  (1964). The House of Commons, 1754–1790. New York, Published for the History of Parliament Trust by Oxford University Press

1774 in politics
1774 in Great Britain
1774